Brannick is the anglicized form of the Irish surname Breathnach. Notable people with the surname include:

James Brannick (1889–1917), English footballer
John Brannick (1830–1895), Irish whiskey distiller
 Sister Maura Brannick, founder of Sister Maura Brannick Health Center

English-language surnames
Anglicised Irish-language surnames